Jishuitan station is a station on Line 2 and Line 19 of the Beijing Subway.

History
The station for Line 2 opened on September 20, 1984. It was closed for renovation (in order to interchange with Line 19) on April 10, 2021, and reopened on June 18, 2021. The station for Line 19 opened on December 31, 2021.

Around the station
 Deshengmen bus terminal
 Fayuan Mosque

Station Layout 
The station has underground island platforms for both line 2 and line 19.

Exits 
There are 7 exits, lettered A, B1, B2, C, D, F and G1. Exits B, C and F are accessible.

Gallery

References

External links
 

Railway stations in China opened in 1984
Beijing Subway stations in Xicheng District